Praat ("talk") is a free computer software package for speech analysis in phonetics. It was designed, and continues to be developed, by Paul Boersma and David Weenink of the University of Amsterdam. It can run on a wide range of operating systems, including various versions of Unix, Linux, Mac and Microsoft Windows (2000, XP, Vista, 7, 8, 10). The program supports speech synthesis, including articulatory synthesis. Its logo depicts a mouth over an ear.

Version history

References

External links
 
 

Free audio software
Free linguistic software
Linguistic research software
Free software programmed in C
Phonetics
Phonology